Dubautia syndetica, the Wahiawa dubautia, is a plant species endemic to the island of Kauai in the state of Hawaii. It is found only in the upper portions of the Wahiawa drainage basin at elevations of 680–950 m.

Dubautia syndetica is a branching shrub up to 3 m tall. Leaves opposite, up to 16 cm long, elliptic to lanceolate, dark green above, lighter below, tapering to a point at the tip. Flowering heads 10-90, with reddish-purple phyllaries. Each head has 8-17 pale yellow flowers.

References

syndetica
Endemic flora of Hawaii
Biota of Kauai